Ireland's Fittest Family is an Irish TV series where families from across Ireland compete in different adventure races and fitness competitions in an effort to win €15,000 and the title of 'Ireland's Fittest Family'.

Since 2014 there have been ten seasons of the programme and three celebrity specials.

Season 1 
The first season saw coaches, Davy Fitzgerald, Kenneth Egan, Nikki Symmons and Eddie O'Sullivan take part in the competition.

In the first episode each coach began with three families.

The Heats took place in Dublin docks, the quarterfinals took place in Killary Adventure Centre, the semifinals took place in Hell and Back, the final returned to Dublin docks.

The winning family were the O'Reilly family from County Cavan coached by Nikki Symmons.

Season 2 
The second season saw coaches, Davy Fitzgerald and Kenneth Egan return. New coaches Derval O'Rourke and Jason Sherlock replaced Nikki Symmons and Eddie O'Sullivan.

The second season also saw Season 1 runners-up, the Daverns return for a second year in a row. Season 1 early eliminated family, the Rices returned for a second year in a row too, this time with their brother David replacing their brother Stephen.

The first round heats took place in Spike Island in County Cork, the second round took place in Killary Adventure Centre, the quarterfinals took place in Hell and Back, the semifinal was in Lough Key Forest Park and the final returned to Hell and Back.

The winning family were the Kingston family from County Cork coached by Derval O'Rourke who defeated the Mulhare family from County Laois also coached by O'Rourke. This remains the only time two families went head to head in the final race mentored by the same coach.

*The ‘Unnamed family’ was edited from the eventual airing of the series after it was discovered, after filming, that one of the family members had been involved in criminal activity.

Season 3 
The third season in 2015 saw coaches, Davy Fitzgerald and Jason Sherlock return. New coaches Alan Quinlan and Anna Geary replaced Kenneth Egan and Derval O'Rourke.

Unlike the previous two season, Season 3 saw the coaches begin with no assigned families. After the results of the heats the coaches chose who they wanted on their teams.

This season saw the Daverns return for a third year in a row, having previously finished in second and third place in Season 1 and 2, respectively. Season 2 families, the Kearneys and the Wyldes both returned to the competition for a second year in a row. The Behans from Season 2 also returned for a second year, however, they replaced their son and brother, Daryl, with their other son and brother, Thomas, on the team.

The Farren family became the first ever team from Northern Ireland to compete.

- Heat 1 was overseen by Anna Geary and Davy Fitzgerald. After winning a coin toss Anna had the first pick. She chose, the Daverns, Davy chose the O'Brien Devines, Anna chose the McGraynors and Davy was left with the Behans. Following an injury sustained in the first heat, Michele McGraynor wasn't permitted to continue in the show, forcing the McGraynors to drop out of the competition. They were replaced on Anna's team by the fastest losing family from the Heats, the Thompsons.

- Heat 2 was overseen by Alan Quinlan and Jason Sherlock. After winning a coin toss Jason had the first pick. He chose, the Kearneys, Alan chose the Naylors, Jason chose the Farrens and Alan was left with the Wyldes.

The Heats took place in Dún Laoghaire harbour, the quarterfinals took place in Killary Adventure Centre, the semifinal took place in Mayhem in Cahir, County Tipperary and the final was in Shannon Airport.

The season was won by the O'Brien Devine family from County Waterford coached by Davy Fitzgerald.

Season 4 
The fourth season in 2016 saw coaches, Alan Quinlan, Anna Geary and Davy Fitzgerald return. New coach Stephen Hunt replaced Jason Sherlock.

Like the previous seasons, Season 4 saw the coaches begin with no assigned families. After the results of the heats, the coaches chose who they wanted on their teams.

This season was the first since Season 1 to have twelve brand new families who'd never competed in the show previously.

- Heat 1 was overseen by Davy Fitzgerald and Stephen Hunt. After winning a coin toss Stephen had the first pick. He chose, the McCarthys, Davy chose the Mullins family, Stephen chose the Bailys and Davy was left with the Maritz family.

- Heat 2 was overseen by Alan Quinlan and Anna Geary. After winning a coin toss Anna had the first pick. She chose, the Broadhursts, Alan chose the Ryans, Anna chose the Cummins family and Alan was left with the Griffins.

The Heats took place on the Tough Mudder course, the second round took place in Dublin docks, the quarterfinals took place in Mayhem in Cahir, Co. Tipperary, the semifinal took place in Killary Adventure Centre and the final returned to Dublin docks.

The season was won by the Cummins family from County Tipperary coached by Anna Geary.

Season 5 
On 10 May 2017 it was announced that Derval O'Rourke would be returning to the coaching panel for the first time since Season 2. It was also confirmed that Anna Geary and Davy Fitzgerald would return for a third and fifth season in a row, respectively. On 1 June 2017 it was announced that rugby player Donncha O'Callaghan would join the panel as the fourth coach.

The Beirnes from County Leitrim returned to the season for a second chance at the title. They were previously eliminated in the first round in Season 3. Colm Naylor of the Naylor family from Season 3 also returned to this year's season, this time, with three brand new team members.

In a show-first, each of the heats were overseen by all four coaches. After all four heats, eight families remained; the coaches then drew lots to determine the order in which they would choose. Derval had the first pick - she chose the Cores, Anna had the second pick – she chose the Meaghers, Davy had the third pick – he chose the O'Connors and Donncha had the fourth pick he chose the Beirnes. For the second round of picks, the order was reversed meaning Donncha had the fifth pick – he chose the Smyths, Davy had the sixth pick – he chose the Naylors, Anna had the seventh pick – she chose the Guilfoyles and Derval was left the last family standing – the Hynes family.

The Heats took place at Camden Fort Meagher, the second round took place at Hell and Back, the quarterfinals took place at Cork Docks, the semifinal took place at Killary Adventure Centre and the final returned to Hell and Back.

In the second round of the competition, Cathal O'Connor of the O'Connor family suffered a fracture to his arm. He was ruled out from competing in the rest of the competition but was replaced by his older brother, Ciaran.

The season was won by the Beirne family from County Leitrim coached by Donncha O'Callaghan. They became the first family who had previously competed in the competition to come back and win the show.

Season 6 
Applications for the sixth season opened in May 2018. For the first time ever, all four coaches from the previous year, Anna Geary, Davy Fitzgerald, Derval O'Rourke and Donncha O'Callaghan, returned for a second year in a row. This will be the first time all four coaches will have won a previous season; meaning that the coach that won this season will be the first coach to ever win twice.
On 30 July 2018 it was announced that Mairéad Ronan would step back as host from this season to give birth to her third child. Kathryn Thomas replaced her as host.

This was the first season to ever start with more than twelve families. Twenty families featured in the first episode, with eight being eliminated before its conclusion. It was also the first season since Season 4 not to feature any families who had previously competed in the competition.

Following the first round, twelve families remained. The coaches drew lots to determine the order of selection. Anna had the first pick - she chose the Finnegan Hogans, Donncha had the second pick - he chose the Lawlors, Davy had the third pick - he chose the Pierses and Derval had the fourth pick - she chose the Cartys. For the second round of picks, the order was reversed meaning Derval had the fifth pick - she chose the Finnegans, Davy had the sixth pick - he chose the McDonalds, Donncha had the seventh pick - he chose the Lallys and Anna had the eighth pick - she chose the Coneys. For the final round of selection, Anna had the ninth pick - she chose the McDonnells, Donncha had the tenth pick - he chose the Furlongs, Derval had the eleventh pick - she chose the Sinnotts, which meant Davy was left with the Lipinskis.

The first round was spread out over two locations the 'Battle of the Beach' took place on Dollymount, 'Vertigo' came from on top of the Irish Life Centre. The second round came from an abandoned tannery in Portlaw. The Quarterfinals were held in Dublin Docklands, the Semifinals were in Hell & Back and the Grand Final was held for the first time in Croke Park.

The season was won by the Coney family from County Tyrone coached by Anna Geary, making her the first coach to win twice.

Season 7 
In April 2019, the series was confirmed to be returning for a seventh year with Mairéad Ronan resuming hosting duties following her departure from the show the previous year to give birth. For the third year-in-a row, all four coaches, Anna Geary, Davy Fitzgerald, Derval O'Rourke and Donncha O'Callaghan, returned to the competition.

This season began with fifteen families. For the second year-in-a-row, none of the families had ever competed in the competition before.

Following the first round, twelve families remained. The coaches drew lots to determine the order of selection. Davy had the first pick - he chose the Hogans, Anna had the second pick - she chose the Mahers, Derval had the third pick - she chose the Dinans and Donncha had the fourth pick - he chose the O'Driscolls. For the second round of picks, the order was reversed meaning Donncha had the fifth pick - he chose the McSharrys, Derval had the sixth pick - she chose the Murphys, Anna had the seventh pick - she chose the Uí Bhraonáin family and Davy had the eighth pick - he chose the McComiskeys. For the final round of selection, Davy had the ninth pick - he chose the Cookes, Anna had the tenth pick - she chose the McArdles, Derval had the eleventh pick - she chose the Mandiangus, which meant Donncha was left with the Prendergasts.

The first round took place across two locations in Dublin. The three heats happened in Poolbeg while the eliminators took place at Kilternan ski-slope. The second round took place in Sligo Airport and Strandhill beach. The quarterfinals took place at Hell & Back, while the semi-finals came from Dublin Docklands. The final came from Croke Park for the second year-in-a-row.

The season was won by the McSharry family from County Sligo coached by Donncha O'Callaghan, making him the second coach to pull off a second win.

Season 8 
In May 2020, the series was confirmed to be returning for an eighth edition with Mairéad Ronan returning as host. For the fourth year-in-a row, all four coaches, Anna Geary, Davy Fitzgerald, Derval O'Rourke and Donncha O'Callaghan, were announced to be returning to the competition. The season didn't air during its usual autumn schedule, instead it was pushed to January 2021 in what was Dancing with the Stars' slot which wasn't able to air due to the COVID-19 pandemic.

This season began with sixteen families. For the third year-in-a-row, none of the families had ever competed in the competition before.

For the first time since Season 2, the coaches selected the families they wanted to work with prior to meeting them. Meaning, unlike the previous five seasons, every family was assigned to a coach. Due to the COVID-19 pandemic, the entire season was filmed in Hell & Back's course in Killruddery, Co. Wicklow.

The season was won by the Mahoney family from County Wexford coached by Davy Fitzgerald, making him the third coach to get a second win.

Season 9 
In May 2021, the series was confirmed to be returning for a ninth season with Mairéad Ronan returning as host for her eighth season. For the fifth year-in-a row, all four coaches, Anna Geary, Davy Fitzgerald, Derval O'Rourke and Donncha O'Callaghan, were announced to be returning to the competition.

Similar to the previous year, the season began with sixteen families and the coaches selected the families they wanted to work with prior to meeting them. Once again, due to the COVID-19 pandemic, the entire season was filmed in Hell & Back's course in Killruddery, Co. Wicklow. In a small twist, for Heats 3 and 4 there was no immediate elimination after the first challenge. Instead, the families were competing in the first challenge to automatically book a place in the quarterfinal. Therefore, both losing families in the second and third challenge in Heats 3 and 4 were eliminated.

For the fourth year-in-a-row, none of the families had ever competed in the competition before.

The season was won by the Kinsella family from County Wexford coached by Anna Geary, making her the first coach to win three times.

Season 10 
In May 2022, it was confirmed that the series would return for a tenth season. On 27 May, Derval O'Rourke announced she was leaving the show after six non-consecutive seasons. On 31 May, it was announced that jockey Nina Carberry would replace her. It was also confirmed that Mairead Ronan would return as host for her ninth season and Davy Fitzgerald, Anna Geary and Donncha O'Callaghan would return as coaches for a tenth, eighth and sixth time, respectively.

This was the first season since Season 5 to have families who competed previously return to take part again. The McNallys, who finished in third place in Season 1, returned alongside the Rice family who competed in both Seasons 1 and 2. The Finnegans from Season 6 also returned, this time with Lauren and Sarah, who replaced their mother, Nicola and brother, Adam who took part previously.

The season was won by the Nugent family from County Louth coached by Davy Fitzgerald, making him the second coach to win three times.

Celebrity Specials

2018 
On 31 December 2018, following the sixth season, a one-off Christmas special involving celebrity families took place. Each family taking part was awarded €1,000 for a charity of their choice.

The celebrities which took part were;
Brian Redmond - Dancing with the Stars judge
Keith Walsh - RTÉ 2FM presenter
Norma Sheahan - Actress
Sean and Conor Price - The X Factor contestants

The show was won by Norma Sheahan and her family. They won €10,000 for their charity of choice.

2019 
On 31 December 2019, following the seventh season, the Christmas special returned for a second year in a row. Each family taking part was awarded €1,000 for a charity of their choice.

The celebrities which took part were;

Brian Dowling - TV presenter
Dave O'Sullivan - Fair City actor
Jacqui Hurley - RTÉ Sport presenter
Rob & Marian Heffernan - Olympic athletes

The show was won by Rob & Marian Heffernan and their family. They won €10,000 for their charity of choice.

2020 
On 28 December 2020, before the launch of the eighth season, the Christmas special returned for a third year in a row. Each family taking part was awarded €1,000 for a charity of their choice.

The celebrities which took part were;

James Kavanagh - Social media influencer and television personality
John Sharpson - Home School Hub 'muinteoir'''
Katie Walsh, Ruby Walsh & Nina Carberry - JockeysLynn Ruane - PoliticianThe show was won by the Walshes. They won €10,000 for their charity of choice.

 2021 
On 27 December 2021, following the ninth season, the Christmas special returned for a fourth year in a row. Each family taking part was awarded €1,000 for a charity of their choice.

The celebrities which took part were;

 David and Stephen Flynn - The Happy Pear'' owners
 Grainne Gallanagh - Former Miss Universe Ireland
 Neil Delamere - Comedian
 Sinead Quinlan - The Den reporter

The show was won by David and Stephen Flynn and their family. They won €10,000 for their charity of choice.

2022 
On 28 December 2022, following the tenth season, the Christmas special returned for a fifth year in a row. Each family taking part was awarded €1,000 for a charity of their choice.

The celebrities which took part were;

 Bláthnaid Treacy - TV and radio presenter
 Emma Doran - Comedian
 Glenda Gilson - TV presenter
 Tadhg Fleming - Social media personality

The show was won by Tadhg Fleming and his family. They won €10,000 for their charity of choice.

Coaches

Hosts

References 

Irish reality television series
RTÉ original programming